Thomas Rentmeister (born March 4, 1964 in Reken, North Rhine-Westphalia, Germany) is a German artist. He currently lives in Berlin and teaches at the Braunschweig University of Art (Hochschule für Bildende Künste Braunschweig).

Biography

Rentmeister studied from 1987 to 1993 at the Kunstakademie Düsseldorf where he was taught by Günther Uecker and Alfonso Hüppi. In 1999 he became a lecturer at the Kunsthochschule Kassel. He taught at the Berlin University of the Arts from 2002 to 2004 and at the Kunsthochschule Berlin-Weißensee from 2005–2006. He became a lecturer at the Hochschule für Bildende Künste Braunschweig in 2007 and was promoted to professor in 2009.

Work

Rentmeister has become known to a larger audience with his high-gloss polyester sculptures which look like oversized blobs or comic figures. Beginning in 1999, he has worked repeatedly with Nutella Spread and Penaten Baby Cream. He adopts “a set of industrially mass-produced domestic materials as units or building blocks, from sugar cubes and cotton tips to Tempo tissues, electrical sockets and whole refrigerators.” He then makes sculptures using these materials.

“His art is never a hermetic, self-contained work, an aesthetic monad; the identity of the non-artistic materials always remains recognizable.” The irreverence with which Rentmeister combines art and life is the most extraordinary aspect of his work.

Rentmeister references Minimalism but freshens up its “severe stylistic vocabulary with a healthy dash of Post Pop and Dadaist nonconformity.” Ursula Panhans-Bühler has called this “impure Minimalism.”

Exhibition catalogues and features emphasize Rentmeister’s humor. “His tools are humor and his approach is that of the parodist.” He knows how to align density in form and content with humor. But Rentmeister is more than a senior ironist. Thomas Rentmeister in an interview with Deutschlandfunk: “My work is saturated with irony; but this is not the only motivation that drives me. If you omitted the irony, my oeuvre would still work.”

Rentmeister and his work steers clear of one-dimensional definitions. “Rentmeister’s work oscillates between an emotional ‘will to art’ and a humorous art and institutional critique, between a reference to everyday life and the aspirations of art, whereby the artist carefully avoids taking a clear stand.”

The philosopher Hannes Böhringer writes in his essay “Fridge kaput”:  The refrigerator installations draft “an image of an entropic end-stage in art.”

The “motor behind Rentmeister’s work” is the “balancing act between seduction and repulsion, between the aesthetic and the unpleasant. The artist wants to “find the point where the sweet, the beautiful suddenly turns into the disgusting, the repressed and the inappropriate”; according to this, Rentmeister’s whole oeuvre is characterized by a “fully developed paradoxical strategy of ambivalence.” The “theme of transience” also “discreetly but nevertheless unmistakably permeates broad sections of his oeuvre.”

Exhibitions

Rentmeister has shown at numerous international galleries and museums.  Rentmeister’s work was the subject of the mid-career retrospective Objects. Food. Rooms.

Selected solo exhibitions

 2014 Considering the Matter,  Meštrović Pavilion - Home of HDLU, Croatian Association of Artists, Zagreb, Croatia
 2012  Objects. Food. Rooms., Perth Institute of Contemporary Arts, Perth, Australia
 2011  Objects. Food. Rooms., Kunstmuseum Bonn, Germany
 2008  Denken in Werken, Centraal Museum Utrecht, Netherlands
 2007  Mehr, Haus am Waldsee, Berlin, Germany
 2006  Die Löcher der Dinge, Museum Ostwall, Dortmund, Germany
 2005  Minimal Pop, Museum Boijmans van Beuningen, Rotterdam, Netherlands
 2004  Zwischenlandung, Kunsthalle Nürnberg, Germany
 2002  WerkRaum.10, Hamburger Bahnhof (Berlin), Germany
 2001  braun, Kölnischer Kunstverein, Cologne, Germany
 1997 Centre d'Art Contemporain de Vassivière en Limousin (with Thomas Demand), France
 1995 Abteiberg Museum, Mönchengladbach, Germany

Rentmeister's work is in numerous collections including the Arp Museum Bahnhof Rolandseck, Remagen, Germany; Kolumba, Cologne, Germany; MARTa Herford, Germany; Museum Boijmans van Beuningen, Rotterdam, Netherlands; Museum für Moderne Kunst, Frankfurt am Main, Germany; Museum Ludwig, Cologne, Germany; Museum Ostwall, Dortmund, Germany; Abteiberg Museum, Mönchengladbach, Germany; Lehmbruck-Museum, Duisburg, Germany

Selected books

 Thomas Rentmeister and Christoph Schreier: Thomas Rentmeister. Objects. Food. Rooms. Kunstmuseum Bonn / Perth Institute of Contemporary Arts, 2011, 
 Thomas Rentmeister and Hannelore Kersting: Kunst der Gegenwart. 1960 bis 2007. Städtisches Museum Abteiberg Mönchengladbach, 2007, 
 Thomas Rentmeister and Ellen Seifermann: Thomas Rentmeister: Zwischenlandung, Kunsthalle Nürnberg, 2004, 
 Thomas Rentmeister and Udo Kittelmann: Thomas Rentmeister: braun / brown, Kölnischer Kunstverein, 2002,

References

External links
 Thomas Rentmeister Website
 Thomas Rentmeister at Braunschweig University of Art
 Aurel Scheibler/ScheiblerMitte, Berlin, Germany
 Ellen de Bruijne Projects, Amsterdam, Netherlands
 Video about Rentmeisters 'blob' sculptures (Dutch)

German sculptors
German male sculptors
German contemporary artists
1964 births
Living people
Academic staff of the Braunschweig University of Art